Jordi van Gelderen (born 26 April 1990) is a Dutch professional footballer who plays as a defender for Legmeervogels Uithoorn.

Career
Born in Amstelveen, Van Gelderen has played club football in the Netherlands and Finland for Haarlem, Argon, Willem II and JJK. Van Gelderen scored on his debut for JJK in May 2012, and he appeared in the qualifying rounds of the 2012 Europa League for them. He joined KTP for the 2015 season.

References

1990 births
Living people
Dutch footballers
Dutch expatriate footballers
Expatriate footballers in Finland
Sportspeople from Amstelveen
HFC Haarlem players
SV Argon players
Willem II (football club) players
JJK Jyväskylä players
Kotkan Työväen Palloilijat players
Derde Divisie players
Veikkausliiga players
Ykkönen players
Association football defenders
Dutch expatriate sportspeople in Finland
Expatriate footballers in Germany
Footballers from North Holland